Thomas Franke (born 21 January 1988) is a German professional football manager and player who is the manager of NOFV-Oberliga Nord club TSG Neustrelitz and plays for Füchse Berlin Reinickendorf.

Playing career

Energie Cottbus
Franke played in the Regionalliga Nord for Energie Cottbus II during the 2007–08 season, when he made 20 appearances, and during the 2008–09 season, when he made 30 appearances. He didn't make any Bundesliga during the 2007–08 season and 2008–09 season. Energie Cottbus were relegated to the 2. Bundesliga for the 2009–10 season where he made three appearances for the club. Energie Cottbus head coach Claus-Dieter Wollitz gave Franke his debut against Fortuna Düsseldorf which Energie Cottbus won 4–2. Franke went on to play in a 0–0 draw against Hansa Rostock and in a 4–1 win against Rot Weiss Ahlen.

Dynamo Dresden
Franke joined Dynamo Dresden for the 2010–11 season where he made 10 3. Liga appearances.

TSG Neustrelitz
Franke joined TSG Neustrelitz for the 2012–13 season. Franke scored one goal in 26 appearances during the 2012–13 season. He started the 2013–14 season with an appearance in the DFB-Pokal against SC Freiburg. Neustrelitz lost to Freiburg. Franke went on to play in 30 Regionalliga matches. Neustrelitz qualified for the Regionalliga playoffs where Franke made another 2 appearances. On 22 May 2015, Franke informed club managers that he was leaving the club at the end of the season. Franke had scored two goals in 27 appearances during 2014–15 season.

Kickers Offenbach
Franke joined Kickers Offenbach on 8 July 2015 where he made 21 appearances.

Viktoria Berlin

Franke joined Viktoria Berlin for the 2016–17 season. Franke made 31 appearances during the 2016–17 season and 17 appearances during 2017–18 season.

Tennis Borussia Berlin
Franke joined Tennis Borussia Berlin during the 2017–18 season where he scored two goals in 14 appearances. He scored two goals in 28 appearances in the 2018–19 season, five goals in 18 appearances during the 2019–20 season Tennis Borussia Berlin were promoted to the Regionalliga Nordost for the 2020–21 season where he scored a goal in 7 appearances.

Füchse Berlin Reinickendorf
After having initially announced his retirement from playing in 2021 to focus on his managerial career, Franke joined Füchse Berlin Reinickendorf in September 2022.

Managerial career
On 16 February 2022, Franke was appointed head coach of Regionalliga club Tasmania Berlin. He left the club again at the end of the season.

Frank was announced as the new head coach of NOFV-Oberliga Nord club TSG Neustrelitz on 15 September 2022, returning to the club where he was once captain.

Career statistics

References

External links
 
 Thomas Franke at Scoresway
 Thomas Franke at Fupa

1988 births
Living people
Sportspeople from Brandenburg an der Havel
Footballers from Brandenburg
German footballers
FC Energie Cottbus players
FC Energie Cottbus II players
Dynamo Dresden players
2. Bundesliga players
3. Liga players
Regionalliga players
Oberliga (football) players
TSG Neustrelitz players
Kickers Offenbach players
FC Viktoria 1889 Berlin players
Tennis Borussia Berlin players
Füchse Berlin Reinickendorf players
Association football midfielders
German football managers
Regionalliga managers
Oberliga (football) managers